William Palmer Pyle (June 6, 1937 – September 30, 2021) was a former professional American football guard who played in the National Football League (NFL) and the American Football League (AFL). He played for six seasons for the NFL's Baltimore Colts and Minnesota Vikings and the AFL's Oakland Raiders.

His brother Mike Pyle, son Eric Kumerow and grandson Jake Kumerow also had NFL careers, as well as his grandsons Joey and Nick Bosa.

He was married to Marie Accardo but later divorced.

References

1937 births
2021 deaths
People from Keokuk, Iowa
Players of American football from Iowa
American football offensive guards
Michigan State Spartans football players
Baltimore Colts players
Minnesota Vikings players
Oakland Raiders players
American Football League players